The Swoboda Bakery was built in 1888 in the Little Bohemia neighborhood of Omaha, Nebraska. It was listed on the National Register of Historic Places on July 19, 1996.

History
Constructed in 1888 by Joseph Dworak & Company, the Swoboda Bakery was central to Omaha's Czech immigrant community. The two-story building was originally designed as a mixed-use commercial and residential property. After a City-funded rehabilitation was completed in 1996, the building was converted to rental residential space only.

See also
History of Omaha

References

Czech-American culture in Omaha, Nebraska
Czech restaurants in the United States
National Register of Historic Places in Omaha, Nebraska
History of South Omaha, Nebraska
Commercial buildings completed in 1888
Residential buildings completed in 1888
Landmarks in South Omaha, Nebraska
Bakeries of the United States
Commercial buildings on the National Register of Historic Places in Nebraska